Marina Benedict is an American actress best known for her role in the Golden Globe nominated series Flesh and Bone as Toni Cannava; Prison Break: Resurrection as Emily "A&W" Blake; Gotham as Cherry; ER as Lois Landry; Torchwood: Miracle Day as Charlotte Wills; and Burn Notice as Col. Oksana Zhirkov.

Career
Benedict was the lead singer in BMG's pop group 5 NY that toured throughout Europe and received a Billboard Top 40 hit in Germany.

Personal life
Benedict attended the Cornish College of the Arts. Benedict became an instructor at the American Musical and Dramatic Academy in 2003. She is the Co-Chair of the Dance Department.

Filmography

Film

Television

References

External links

American film actresses
American television actresses
American stage actresses
American women singers
American women choreographers
American choreographers
American female dancers
Place of birth missing (living people)
21st-century American women
Living people
1960 births